Kyalami Grand Prix Circuit (from Khaya lami, My home in Zulu) is a  motor racing circuit located in Midrand, Gauteng, South Africa, just north of Johannesburg. The circuit has been used for Grand Prix and Formula One races and has hosted the South African Grand Prix twenty times. Among the Formula One races held at the track the 1977 South African Grand Prix stands out, as it is principally remembered for the fatal accident that claimed the lives of race marshal Frederick Jansen van Vuuren and driver Tom Pryce. In recent years, the area surrounding the circuit has developed into a residential and commercial suburb of Johannesburg. More recently, Kyalami has played host to five rounds of the Superbike World Championship from 1998 to 2002 and later in 2009 and 2010, the season finale of the Superstars Series in 2009 and 2010, and the South African round of the 2008–09 A1 Grand Prix season. International racing returned to the circuit in November 2019, when it hosted the 2019 Kyalami 9 Hours, serving as the season finale of the 2019 Intercontinental GT Challenge.

History 
The original, sweeping circuit was in use from 1961 until political sanctions (due to apartheid policies) eliminated the Grand Prix after the 1985 race. When the circuit was rebuilt in the early 1990s as part of a commercial development, Leeukop Bend, the Kink, Pit lane, the start/finish straight, Crowthorne Corner and Barbeque Bend were all eliminated. Jukskei Sweep was heavily modified to create the entrance into the bend before the then newly built Pit lane and start/finish straight. The remaining part of the old fast circuit, modified to a lesser degree were Sunset Bend, Clubhouse Bend and the Esses still incorporated into the current configuration, with the result that the circuit became a narrow, twisty ribbon rather than one of the fastest circuits on the calendar. Formula One abandoned the rebuilt circuit in 1993 after just two races on the new layout, caused by a bankruptcy on the part of the promoter.

It hosted the South African motorcycle Grand Prix until 1992.

Kyalami was changed again with the building of the current pit lane and start/finish straight and later again changes were made, with the addition of a chicane which in turn was removed again for the 2009 World Superbike race. Kyalami came under new management and 2008 saw the 50th anniversary of the 9-hour revival being held at Kyalami with golden oldies like David Piper and others. On 6 June 2014, it was announced that Kyalami would be auctioned off on 24 July without reserve. On 24 July 2014, it was auctioned off for R205 million. The winning bidder was Toby Venter, owner of Porsche South Africa. R100 million was invested to upgrade the circuit, allowing it to successfully obtain an FIA Grade 2 status.

On 12 December 2019, the provisional calendar for the 2020–21 FIA World Endurance Championship was announced, containing a six-hour race at Kyalami scheduled for 6 February 2021. However, after the calendar was revised due to the COVID-19 pandemic, Kyalami was removed.

Layout history

A lap in a GT3 car

A few hundred metres after the start/finish line, the first corner The Kink, a full throttle right handed kink, awaits. Barrelling further down the straight at full throttle, the second corner, named Crowthorne awaits. The typical braking point is around the  board. A second gear left-handed corner, it tightens before opening up on exit, setting the driver up for turns 3 and 4. The Jukskei Sweep as these corners were dubbed after the re-design, are a flat-out right-hander followed by a flat-out left handed kink throwing the driver into the braking zone for turn 5. Barbeque is a second gear left-handed corner which takes the driver onto the line of the classic circuit layout. Utilising the kerb on the exit of Barbeque is necessary as the driver has a short straight to prepare for turn 6. The driver would wait until after the  board before lifting off the throttle and dipping on the brakes through the quick right-hander known as Sunset, one of only four corners left as they were in the first layout. A short burst of throttle is followed by braking at the  board for turn 7, Clubhouse, a slow left-hander typically taken in second gear. Once again utilising the exit kerb, the driver barrels down a short straight before braking, again at the  board, for turn 8. Turns 8 and 9, known as The Esses, are the final corners left over from the first layout. 8 is a medium-speed left hander typically taken in third gear, dipping the driver downhill before the car is flicked right into turn 9. The driver typically decelerates and shifts down the gears to second or first gear, meeting the apex of the corner before accelerating through turn 11. The back straight lasts for a few hundred metres before the driver approaches turn 12, a flat-out left hander known as Mineshaft. Spotting a braking point for turn 13, the first corner of The Crocodiles, can be hard, as it is an off-camber right handed turn which can be taken with several different lines. Turn 14 is little more than the full throttle exit of turn 13, and sets the driver up for turn 15. Cheetah is a tight right hander which the driver typically only needs to lift off the throttle for. It's important to carry speed through it, before spotting a braking point for the final corner. Ingwe is a slow left-hander which sends the driver back onto the start–finish straight to complete the lap.

South African Grand Prix
From 1967 to 1993, Kyalami hosted 21 editions of the South African Grand Prix. Perhaps the most infamous of these was the 1982 edition, when the Grand Prix Drivers' Association staged a strike in protest of new superlicence conditions imposed by FISA.

Niki Lauda became the most successful driver at Kyalami, taking his third victory at the circuit in 1984. Alain Prost, Nigel Mansell and Jackie Stewart are the joint second-most successful drivers at the circuit, with two wins each. Jody Scheckter became the first and only South African driver to win their home race during the 1975 edition. Ferrari and Williams are the most successful constructors at the circuit, with four wins each.

In June 2022 it was reported that Stefano Domenicali, the President of Formula One, had flown to South Africa to meet representatives of the circuit about a possible return for F1 in 2023, but was not included in the 2023 provisional calendar.

Lap records
The official fastest race lap records of the Kyalami Grand Prix Circuit are listed as:

See also

 Francis Tucker
 List of Kyalami Grand Prix Circuit fatalities

Notes

References

External links
Map and circuit history at RacingCircuits.info 
Kyalami Marshals Association
Satellite picture by Google Maps
Kyalami Kart Circuit
Shelby Can-Am

Formula One circuits
A1 Grand Prix circuits
Grand Prix motorcycle circuits
Motorsport venues in South Africa
South African Grand Prix
South African motorcycle Grand Prix
Superbike World Championship circuits
Sports venues in Johannesburg
Sports venues completed in 1961